Sascha Marquet (born 7 November 1989) is a German footballer who plays as a forward or attacking midfielder for Fortuna Köln.

In his youth he went through the ranks of five clubs from his hometown Leverkusen: SSV Lützenkirchen, SV Schlebusch, TuS Quettingen (until 2004), VfL Leverkusen (2004–07) and Bayer Leverkusen (2007–08).

References

External links

1989 births
Living people
Sportspeople from Leverkusen
German footballers
Footballers from North Rhine-Westphalia
Association football midfielders
Bayer 04 Leverkusen II players
Alemannia Aachen players
SC Fortuna Köln players
TSV Steinbach Haiger players
2. Bundesliga players
3. Liga players
Regionalliga players